Bouclans is a commune in the Doubs department in the Bourgogne-Franche-Comté region in eastern France. On 1 January 2018, the former commune of Vauchamps was merged into Bouclans.

Population

See also
 Communes of the Doubs department

References

Communes of Doubs